Dawand Jones (born August 6, 2001) is an American football offensive tackle for the Ohio State Buckeyes.

Early life and high school career 
Jones attended Ben Davis High School in Indianapolis where he played football and basketball and held Division I offers in both sports. A three-star prospect in the former, Jones committed to play college football at Ohio State University.

College career 
Jones appeared in nine games as a true freshman in 2019, although did not start any. In 2020, he appeared in six of the teams eight games during the COVID shortened season. Jones would emerge as a starter in 2021, starting every game at right tackle for the Buckeyes. At the conclusion of his junior season, Jones was named to the second team All-Big 10 team. On January 17, 2022, Jones announced that he would return to Ohio State for his senior season, forgoing the NFL Draft.

References

External links
Ohio State Buckeyes bio

American football offensive tackles
Ohio State Buckeyes football players
Living people
2001 births
Players of American football from Indianapolis